A corporate forest is a forest or woodland area owned by a corporate body rather than a state or individual.

For example, in Germany, a corporate forest is, in accordance with Section 3, Paragraph 2, of the Federal Forest Act (Bundeswaldgesetz), a wood owned by a public body such as a municipality or town (also called a communal, town or municipal forest or even an "interested parties forest"), a university (then called a university forest) or other specified body.

Forests owned by the Church are not automatically classified by the German federal government as corporate forests, but may be so classified by state law.

Other types of forest may include state forests and private forests.

See also 
 List of types of formally designated forests

References

External links
 Bundesministerium der Justiz: Bundeswaldgesetz vom 2. Mai 1975 (BGBl. I S. 1037) (Vollfassung)
 Oberförster.de: Wem gehört der Wald?
 Bayerische Forstverwaltung: Körperschaftswald

Forest law
Forestry
Types of formally designated forests